Bratków Górny  is a village in the administrative district of Gmina Zadzim within Poddębice County, Łódź Voivodeship in central Poland.

The village has a population of 100 people.

References

Villages in Poddębice County